Nabil Baz (born 6 June 1987) is an Algerian racing cyclist. He rode at the 2013 UCI Road World Championships.

Major results

2008
 2nd Grand Prix de la ville de Tunis
2011
 5th Overall Tour d'Algérie
 7th Road race, All-Africa Games
 9th Circuit d'Alger
2015
 1st Overall Tour International de Sétif
1st Stage 1
 2nd Overall Tour d'Oranie
 5th Overall Tour de Constantine
 5th Circuit de Constantine
 6th Circuit d'Alger
 7th Overall Tour du Maroc
2016
 4th Critérium International de Blida
 10th Circuit de Constantine

References

External links
 

1987 births
Living people
Algerian male cyclists
Place of birth missing (living people)
21st-century Algerian people